Dankaur is a town and a nagar panchayat in Gautam Buddha Nagar District in the state of Uttar Pradesh, India PIN 203201 .

Geography
It has an average elevation of 194 metres (636 feet).
It is situated approximately 55 kilometres east of Delhi along the bank of river Yamuna. The place is well connected by rail link on Northern Railway on Delhi-Aligarh link.

Demographics
 India census, Dankaur had a population of 13,520. Males constitute 54% of the population and females 46%. Dankaur has an average literacy rate of 57%, lower than the national average of 59.5%: male literacy is 67% and, female literacy is 47%.

See also
 Dankaur greater noida
 Dankaur station
 Rampur Bangar
 Rabupura

References

Cities and towns in Gautam Buddh Nagar district